Noemí Santana Perera (born 1984) is a member of the Podemos party and its spokesperson in the Parliament of the Canary Islands.

Early life
Born in Las Palmas on 31 January 1984, Perera attended the University of Las Palmas de Gran Canaria (ULPGC) from where she received her degree in Business Administration and Management. As a student there, she joined the university's student assembly. Later she enrolled in the law course of National University of Distance Education.

Career
Upon the insistence of one of her professors, Perera joined the New Canaries in 2007 and served on its National Executive Committee but being disenchanted, she left it after some time. After attending its first rally in Las Palmas, she became a member of Podemos. During the 2015 Canarian regional election, Podemos made her its official candidate for the post of the President of the Canary Islands.

Perera became a Member of Parliament from Gran Canaria and was chosen the spokesperson of Podemos in the house. She has also worked at the Gran Canaria railway company.

References

1984 births
Living people
21st-century Spanish politicians
21st-century Spanish women politicians
Podemos (Spanish political party) politicians
Members of the 9th Parliament of the Canary Islands
People from Las Palmas
Members of the 10th Parliament of the Canary Islands
University of Las Palmas de Gran Canaria alumni